The 2017–18 Bucknell Bison women's basketball team represents Bucknell University during the 2017–18 NCAA Division I women's basketball season. The Bison, led by seventh year head coach Aaron Roussell, play their home games at Sojka Pavilion and were members of the Patriot League. They finished the season 22–10, 15–3 in Patriot League play to finish in second place. They advanced to the semifinals of the Patriot League women's tournament where they lost to Army. They received an automatic bid to the Women's National Invitation Tournament where they lost to West Virginia in the first round.

Previous season
They finished the season 27–6, 16–2 in Patriot League play win Patriot League regular season title. They won the Patriot League women's tournament to earn an automatic trip to the NCAA women's tournament for the first time since 2008, where they lost to Maryland in the first round.

Roster

Schedule

|-
!colspan=9 style=| Non-conference regular season

|-
!colspan=9 style=| Patriot League regular season

|-
!colspan=9 style=| Patriot League Women's Tournament

|-
!colspan=9 style=| WNIT

See also
 2017–18 Bucknell Bison men's basketball team

References

Bucknell
Bucknell Bison women's basketball seasons
Bucknell
Bucknell
Bucknell